Güvercinlik can refer to:

 Güvercinlik, Beşiri
 Güvercinlik, Osmancık
 Güvercinlik, Sason
 the Turkish name for Acheritou